Events in the year 1932 in Turkey.

Parliament
 4th Parliament of Turkey

Incumbents
President – Kemal Atatürk
Prime Minister – İsmet İnönü

Ruling party and the main opposition
 Ruling party – Republican People's Party (CHP)

Cabinet
7th government of Turkey

Events
15 January: Statue of Honor in Samsun which symbolizes the beginning of Turkish War of Independence. 
22 January: First time ezan in Turkish instead of traditional Arabic.
19 February: Halkevleri, a project to educate citizens mostly in rural areas, open.
12 July: Turkish Language Association  was founded.
1 August: Keriman Halis Ece won the title Miss Universe.
12 August: Turkey joins League of Nations.

Births
22 January – Günseli Başar – Miss Europe (1952)
 5 February – Yoel Marcus, Israeli journalist and political commentator (died 2022). 
 21 February – Aytekin Kotil, politician (died 1992)
7 March – Ekrem Bora, actor
15 March – Arif Mardin, music producer
15 May – Turgay Şeren, footballer
9 September – Müşfik Kenter, theatre actor
17 September – Yalçın Granit, basketball player, basketball coach
20 September – Atilla Karaosmanoğlu, economist, politician
15 October – Muammer Sun, musician
29 October – Füruzan, novelist
27 November – Ülkü Adatepe, Atatürk's adopted daughter
7 December – Oktay Ekşi, journalist
31 December – Muhterem Nur, actress
31 December – Yekta Güngör Özden, judge, former president of the Constitutional Court of Turkey

Deaths
7 January – Ahmet Derviş (born 1881), military officer
18 February – Nurettin Pasha (born 1873), general
21 September – Ahmet Rasim (born 1864), journalist, historian, MD
29 November – Abdullah Cevdet (born 1869), writer, MD

Gallery

References

 
Years of the 20th century in Turkey
Turkey
Turkey
Turkey